Little Addington is a village and civil parish in North Northamptonshire, England, about  south-east of Kettering. At the time of the 2011 census, the parish's population was 328 people. Prior to local government restructuring in 2021 the village was in the area of East Northamptonshire District Council.

The villages name means 'Farm/settlement connected with Eadda/Aeddi'.

Church
The village church is dedicated to St Mary and dates from the late 13th to mid 14th century. It was restored in 1857 by Northampton architect E F Law.

Heritage assets
The following buildings and structures are listed by Historic England as of special architectural or historic interest.

Roman Villa (Scheduled) Unknown date 
Church of St Mary (Grade I) 13th century 
Manor Farmhouse (Grade II) 17th century 
Hill Farmhouse (Grade II) 17th century 
Chancel Cottage (Grade II) 17th century 
Vine Cottage (Grade II) 17th century 
Stoneycroft (Grade II) 18th century 
Church Hill Cottage (Grade II) 18th century 
Surrenden House (Grade II) 18th century 
Barn, Manor Farmhouse (Grade II) 18th century 
Little Addington House (Grade II) 19th century 
War Memorial (Grade II) 20th century

Demography

In 1801 there were 212 persons
In 1831 there were 264 persons
In 1841 there were 229 persons
In 2011 there were 328 persons

References

Villages in Northamptonshire
North Northamptonshire
Civil parishes in Northamptonshire